Charles Francis Adams IV (May 2, 1910 – January 5, 1999) was an American electronics industrialist, United States Naval officer, great-great grandson of the sixth President John Quincy Adams and great-great-great-grandson of the second President John Adams.

Early life
Charles Francis Adams IV was born on May 2, 1910, in Boston, Massachusetts, to United States Secretary of the Navy Charles Francis Adams III (1866–1954), thus a great-great-great-grandson of U.S. President John Adams and great-great-grandson of his son John Quincy Adams. He attended St. Mark's School, graduated from Harvard College in 1932 and attended Harvard Graduate School of Business Administration. Adams was a sixth-generation Harvard legacy student (John Adams graduated from Harvard in 1755).

Career
Adams was commissioned as an ensign in the Naval Reserve on 23 June 1932 and was promoted to lieutenant (junior grade) on 23 June 1937. He served on active duty during World War II. Adams was promoted to the rank of lieutenant commander on 1 May 1943 and to commander on 1 March 1944. He took command of the destroyer escort USS William Seiverling when she was commissioned on 1 June 1944. The Seiverling conducted anti-submarine operations in the Pacific Theater, was under air attack off Okinawa and supported the liberation of the Philippines. He left the service in 1946.

He served as the first president of the Raytheon Company between 1948 and 1960, and again from 1962 to 1964. He served as its chairman between 1960 and 1962, and again from 1964 until 1972. During his tenure, Raytheon grew from a manufacturer of transistors and vacuum tubes into a maker of missiles and military-oriented radar and communications systems.

Personal life
Adams married twice. His first marriage was to Margaret Stockton by whom he had three children: Abigail, Alison, and Timothy. His second marriage was to Beatrice D. Penati by whom he had one stepson: Giannotto Penati. He had a total of nine grandchildren and 18 great-grandchildren at the time of his death, on January  5, 1999, in Dover, Massachusetts, aged 88.

Adams was elected a Fellow of the American Academy of Arts and Sciences in 1959. He was awarded honorary degrees by Suffolk University, Northeastern University, Bates College, and Tufts University.

Family tree

He was first cousin to Constance Crowninshield Coolidge.

References

Adams political family
Crowninshield family
St. Mark's School (Massachusetts) alumni
1910 births
1999 deaths
Adams, Charles Francis 4
Harvard Business School alumni
Businesspeople from Boston
Raytheon Company people
Harvard College alumni